The Helpt Hills are the highest natural elevation in the northeast German state of  Mecklenburg-Vorpommern reaching a maximum height of  above sea level (NHN). The hills are a terminal moraine formed during the Pomeranian stadium of the Weichselian glaciation and were named after the village of Helpt on their northern slopes. 

Other transmission installations have been built not far to the north-northeast of the tower.

See also 
 List of mountain and hill ranges in Germany

References 

Hills of Mecklenburg-Western Pomerania
Mecklenburgische Seenplatte (district)